Aurore Island is an artificial island in Seychelles, lying 2 km from the capital Victoria.

History
The island was created artificially during the 2000s. It belongs to the Mahe Port Islands, which are mostly artificial islands created by funds from Dubai when the Dubai dredger was placed in Seychelles. 
In 2013 work on the island has begun.
By 2020, the island should house a population of 2,000.
In 2016, the new golf course was being built.

Administration
The island belongs to Anse Etoile District.

Tourism
The island's plan is mostly residential. There is a couple of hotels and a golf course.

Image gallery

References

External links 

 
 info
 Mahe Map 2015
 Info on the island

Artificial islands of Seychelles
Islands of Mahé Islands